Wiggenhall may refer to the following places in Norfolk, England: 
Wiggenhall St Germans
Wiggenhall St Germans SSSI
Wiggenhall St Mary Magdalen